Melhania phillipsiae is a plant in the family Malvaceae. It is native to Africa and the Arabian Peninsula.

Description
The flowers have yellow petals.

Distribution and habitat
Melhania phillipsiae is native to an area from Niger east to the Arabian Peninsula. Its habitat is in Acacia-Commiphora scrub. In Oman, Saudi Arabia and Yemen it occurs on mountain slopes.

References

phillipsiae
Flora of Niger
Flora of Egypt
Flora of Northeast Tropical Africa
Flora of the Arabian Peninsula
Plants described in 1898
Taxa named by Edmund Gilbert Baker